Temistocle Solera (25 December 1815 – 21 April 1878) was an Italian opera composer and librettist.

Life and career
He was born in Ferrara. He received his education at the Imperial College in Vienna and at the University of Pavia. Throughout his life he actively participated in anti-Austrian resistance. At one point, he was incarcerated for his activities. He completed several literary works, including the novel Michelino, his style influenced by Alessandro Manzoni. He then found work as a librettist; his collaboration with the composer Giuseppe Verdi began in 1839 and lasted for a few years.

Solera then found work as the impresario for the Royal Theatre in Madrid. He died in Milan in 1878.

List of major works

Composer

 Ildegonda (1840)
 Il contadino d'Agliate (1841; rev. as La fanciulla di Castelguelfo in 1842)
 Genio e sventura (1843)
 La hermana de Pelayo (1845) (Pelayo is a Spanish national hero, the leader of Christian resistance in the Cantabrian mountains against the Arab invasion in the early eighth century)

Librettist

For Giuseppe Verdi
 Oberto, conte di San Bonifacio (1839)
 Nabucco (1842)
 I Lombardi alla prima crociata (1843)
 Giovanna d'Arco (1845)
 Attila (1846)
For other composers
 Galeotto Manfredi (Carlo Hermann; 1842)
 La conquista di Granata (Emilio Arrieta, 1850)
 La fanciulla delle Asturie (Benedetto Secchi; 1856)
 Sordello. Also produced as L'Indovina (Antonio Buzzi, 1856; Salvador Giner Vidal, 1870)
 Pergolese (Stefano Ronchetti-Monteviti, 1857)
 Vasconcello (Angelo Villanis; 1858)
 Una notte di festa (Angelo Villanis; 1859)
 L'espiazione (Achille Peri, 1861)
 Zilia (Gaspar Villate, 1877)

References

External links
 OperaGlass
 Loreta de Stasio y José María Nadal. "Sobre el libreto de La conquista di Granata, de Temistocle Solera". Publicado en Mundoclasico.com el 7 July 2006
  Mundoclasico.com

1815 births
1878 deaths
Burials at the Cimitero Monumentale di Milano
Italian classical composers
Italian opera composers
Male opera composers
Italian opera librettists
Impresarios
Opera managers
Musicians from Ferrara
19th-century classical composers
Italian male classical composers
University of Pavia alumni
Italian male dramatists and playwrights
19th-century Italian dramatists and playwrights
19th-century Italian composers
19th-century Italian male writers
19th-century Italian male musicians